Taysir El Nourani is the Minister of Labour and Administrative Reform of Sudan.

El Nourani began as minister on 9 February 2021.

References

Living people
Sudanese political people
1965 births